Mercantile Center station is a TEXRail commuter rail station in Fort Worth, Texas.

History
The station was originally planned to be named "Beach Street/Mercantile" due to the adjacent street, but the name was changed to "Mercantile Center" in late 2016.

Services

TEXRail
The Mercantile Center station was an opening day station when revenue service began on January 10, 2019.

References

External links
 TEXRail

Railway stations in the United States opened in 2019
2019 establishments in Texas
TEXRail stations
Railway stations in Tarrant County, Texas
Railway stations in Fort Worth, Texas